The 2008 WNBA season was the third season in the WNBA for the Chicago Sky. The Sky, were once again, were looking for a new coach after Bo Overton resigned following one season with the Sky. Assistant Coach Steven Key was hired as the new Head Coach and General Manager.

The Sky received the second over pick in the 2008 WNBA Draft from the draft lottery system. They were able to use this pick on star center Sylvia Fowles out of LSU.

Transactions

Atlanta Dream Expansion Draft
The following player was selected in the Atlanta Dream expansion draft from the Chicago Sky:

WNBA Draft

Trades and Roster Changes

Roster
{| class="toccolours" style="font-size: 95%; width: 100%;"
|-
! colspan="2"  style="background:#4b90cc; color:#Fbb726"|2008 Chicago Sky Roster
|- style="text-align:center; background-color:#Fbb726; color:#FFFFFF;"
! Players !! Coaches
|- 
| valign="top" |
{| class="sortable" style="background:transparent; margin:0px; width:100%;"
! Pos. !! # !! Nat. !! Name !! Ht. !! Wt. !! From
|-

Depth

Schedule

Regular Season

|- bgcolor="ffbbbb"
| 1
| May 17
| @ Seattle
| 61-67
| Chasity Melvin (15)
| Candice Dupree (10)
| PerkinsPrice (2)
| KeyArena12,079
| 0-1
|- bgcolor="#bbffbb"
| 2
| May 22
|  Sacramento
| 87-77
| DupreePrice (22)
| Sylvia Fowles (7)
| Dominique Canty (6)
| UIC Pavilion4,188
| 1-1
|- bgcolor="ffbbbb"
| 3
| May 29
|  Minnesota
| 69-75
| Sylvia Fowles (16)
| Sylvia Fowles (11)
| Dominique Canty (6)
| UIC Pavilion3,014
| 1-2
|-

|- bgcolor="ffbbbb"
| 4
| June 1
| Connecticut
| 73-75
| Jia Perkins (21)
| Sylvia Fowles (12)
| Dominique Canty (5)
| UIC Pavilion2,276
| 1-3
|- bgcolor="ffbbbb"
| 5
| June 3
| Los Angeles
| 77-81 (OT)
| Candice Dupree (22)
| Candice Dupree (11)
| Dominique Canty (8)
| UIC Pavilion6,304
| 1-4
|- bgcolor="#bbffbb"
| 6
| June 6
| @ Atlanta
| 86-72
| CantyPerkins (16)
| DupreePerkins (9)
| Price (5)
| Philips Arena7,418
| 2-4
|- bgcolor="#bbffbb"
| 7
| June 7
| Atlanta
| 91-70
| Candice Dupree (20)
| Chasity Melvin (7)
| Dominique Canty (6)
| UIC Pavilion3,182
| 3-4
|- bgcolor="ffbbbb"
| 8
| June 13
| Washington
| 57-64
| Jia Perkins (17)
| Candice Dupree (8)
| CantyPrice (4)
| UIC Pavilion2,600
| 3-5
|- bgcolor="ffbbbb"
| 9
| June 18
| @ Los Angeles
| 67-80
| Jia Perkins (18)
| Candice Dupree (8)
| CantyDupree (3)
| STAPLES Center7,245
| 3-6
|- bgcolor="ffbbbb"
| 10
| June 20
| @ Phoenix
| 105-112 (OT)
| Jia Perkins (30)
| Candice Dupree (12)
| Candice Dupree (5)
| US Airways Center7,311
| 3-7
|- bgcolor="#ffbbbb"
| 11
| June 22
| @ Sacramento
| 70-82
| Jia Perkins (22)
| Candice Dupree (11)
| Dominique Canty (8)
| ARCO Arena6,107
| 3-8
|- bgcolor="#ffbbbb"
| 12
| June 26
|  Phoenix
| 79-89
| Chasity Melvin (19)
| Chasity Melvin (15)
| Brooke Wyckoff (9)
| UIC Pavilion3,103
| 3-9
|- bgcolor="#bbffbb"
| 13
| June 28
|  Detroit
| 76-59
| Candice Dupree (18)
| DupreeMelvin (8)
| Chasity Melvin (5)
| UIC Pavilion3,407
| 4-9
|-

|- bgcolor="#bbffbb"
| 14
| July 1
| @ Minnesota
| 73-71
| Candice Dupree (26)
| Chasity Melvin (11)
| Dominique Canty (5)
| Target Center4,765
| 5-9
|- bgcolor="#ffbbbb"
| 15
| July 2
| @ Indiana
| 67-74
| Candice Dupree (20)
| Candice Dupree (13)
| DupreeWyckoff (4)
| Conseco Fieldhouse6,196
| 5-10
|- bgcolor="#ffbbbb"
| 16
| July 5
| @ Atlanta
| 84-91
| Jia Perkins (24)
| Candice Dupree (8)
| Dominique Canty (6)
| Philips Arena8,468
| 5-11
|- bgcolor="#ffbbbb"
| 17
| July 10
|  San Antonio
| 67-75
| Jia Perkins (17)
| Candice Dupree (8)
| CantyPerkins (4)
| UIC Pavilion3,040
| 5-12
|- bgcolor="#ffbbbb"
| 18
| July 12
| @ Indiana
| 57-66
| Candice Dupree (19)
| Chasity Melvin (12)
| Chasity Melvin (5)
| Conseco Fieldhouse7,134
| 5-13
|- bgcolor="#bbffbb"
| 19
| July 13
| Atlanta
| 79-66
| DupreePerkins (18)
| Armintie Price (7)
| DupreePerkinsWyckoffFluker (3)
| UIC Pavilion2,907
| 6-13
|- bgcolor="#ffbbbb"
| 20
| July 16
| @ Detroit
| 63-66
| Jia Perkins (26)
| Candice Dupree (12)
| DupreeMelvin (4)
| Palace of Auburn Hills15,210
| 6-14
|- bgcolor="#bbffbb"
| 21
| July 18
|  Connecticut
| 73-65
| Jia Perkins (15)
| Candice Dupree (9)
| K.B. Sharp (4)
| UIC Pavilion3,379
| 7-14
|- bgcolor="#ffbbbb"
| 22
| July 20
| @ Connecticut
| 67-74
| Armintie Price (15)
| Chasity Melvin (10)
| Jia Perkins (5)
| Mohegan Sun Arena7,367
| 7-15
|- bgcolor="#bbffbb"
| 23
| July 22
| Indiana
| 68-60
| Candice Dupree (20)
| Jia Perkins (10)
| Jia Perkins (8)
| UIC Pavilion3,035
| 8-15
|- bgcolor="#ffbbbb"
| 24
| July 24
| @ San Antonio
| 67-78
| Candice Dupree (20)
| Candice Dupree (10)
| PerkinsSharp (3)
| AT&T Center9,372
| 8-16
|- bgcolor="#ffbbbb"
| 25
| July 26
| @ Houston
| 65-79
| Candice Dupree (28)
| Jia Perkins (7)
| Jia Perkins (5)
| Reliant Arena6,569
| 8-17
|-

|-
| colspan="10" align="center" valign="middle" | Summer Olympic break
|- bgcolor="#bbffbb"
| 26
| August 28
| @ New York
| 69-60
| Jia Perkins (19)
| Sylvia Fowles (10)
| Armintie Price (5)
| Madison Square Garden8,566
| 9-17
|- bgcolor="#bbffbb"
| 27
| August 29
| @ Washington
| 79-75
| Jia Perkins (28)
| Sylvia Fowles (13)
| Armintie Price (4)
| Verizon Center10,043
| 10-17
|- bgcolor="#bbffbb"
| 28
| August 31
| Detroit
| 82-81 (OT)
| Candice Dupree (24)
| Sylvia Fowles (12)
| Candice Dupree (7)
| UIC Pavilion4,197
| 11-17
|-

|- bgcolor="#ffbbbb"
| 29
| September 4
| Seattle
| 62-70
| Jia Perkins (22)
| Candice Dupree (6)
| Dominique Canty (6)
| UIC Pavilion3,829
| 11-18
|- bgcolor="#ffbbbb"
| 30
| September 5
| @ Connecticut
| 75-80
| Jia Perkins (18)
| Sylvia Fowles (6)
| Dominique Canty (7)
| Mohegan Sun Arena8,088
| 11-19
|- bgcolor="#ffbbbb"
| 31
| September 7
| @ New York
| 61-69
| Jia Perkins (18)
| Sylvia Fowles (12)
| CantySharp (2)
| Madison Square Garden7,903
| 11-20
|- bgcolor="#bbffbb"
| 32
| September 9
| Washington
| 78-59
| Jia Perkins (17)
| Candice Dupree (10)
| Candice Dupree (6)
| UIC Pavilion3,087
| 12-20
|- bgcolor="#ffbbbb"
| 33
| September 12
| New York
| 62-69
| Candice Dupree (18)
| DupreeFowles (6)
| CantyWyckoff (4)
| UIC Pavilion5,681
| 12-21
|- bgcolor="#ffbbbb"
| 34
| September 14
| Houston
| 76-79
| Candice Dupree (20)
| Armintie Price (7)
| Dominique Canty (6)
| UIC Pavilion4,917
| 12-22
|-

Standings

Statistics

Regular Season

Awards and Honors

References

Chicago Sky seasons
Chicago
Chicago Sky